Milheirós de Poiares is a Portuguese parish, located in the municipality of Santa Maria da Feira. The population in 2011 was 3,791, in an area of 7.87 km2.

Landmarks

Quinta do Seixal

Football (soccer) clubs

Grupo Desportivo Milheiroense

References

Freguesias of Santa Maria da Feira